Dietmar Schwager (15 August 1940 – 20 November 2018) was a German football coach and player. As a player, he spent 12 seasons in the Bundesliga with 1. FC Kaiserslautern.

Honours
 DFB-Pokal finalist: 1972, 1976.

External links
 

1940 births
2018 deaths
German footballers
1. FC Kaiserslautern players
Bundesliga players
German football managers
FC Schalke 04 managers
Borussia Neunkirchen managers
Association football defenders